Lehal is the family name of the Jat people in India and Pakistan.

Lehal may also refer to:

Geography
Lehal Village (Patiala), a village in Patiala.
Lehal Kalan, a village in Sangrur district of the Punjab, India.
Lehal, Jalandhar, a village in Jalandhar district of Punjab State, India.